The 2018 Singapore Open (officially known as the Singapore Badminton Open 2018) was a badminton tournament which took place at the Singapore Indoor Stadium in Singapore from 17 to 22 July 2018 and had a total purse of $355,000.

Tournament
The 2018 Singapore Open was the fourteenth tournament of the 2018 BWF World Tour and also part of the Singapore Open championships, which had been held since 1929. This tournament was organized by the Singapore Badminton Association with the sanction from BWF.

Venue
This international tournament was held at Singapore Indoor Stadium in Singapore.

Point distribution
Below is the point distribution table for each phase of the tournament based on the BWF points system for the BWF World Tour Super 500 event.

Prize money
The total prize money for this tournament was US$355,000. Distribution of prize money was in accordance with BWF regulations.

Men's singles

Seeds

 Chou Tien-chen (champion)
 Ng Ka Long (second round)
 Wong Wing Ki (first round)
 Sameer Verma (withdrew)
 Khosit Phetpradab (second round)
 B. Sai Praneeth (first round)
 Tommy Sugiarto (withdrew)
 Lee Hyun-il (quarter-finals)

Finals

Top half

Section 1

Section 2

Bottom half

Section 3

Section 4

Women's singles

Seeds

 Ratchanok Intanon (withdrew)
 Nitchaon Jindapol (semi-finals)
 Zhang Beiwen (first round)
 Michelle Li (second round)
 Sayaka Takahashi (champion)
 Cheung Ngan Yi (withdrew)
 Gao Fangjie (final)
 Pornpawee Chochuwong (second round)

Finals

Top half

Section 1

Section 2

Bottom half

Section 3

Section 4

Men's doubles

Seeds

 Liao Min-chun / Su Ching-heng (first round)
 Satwiksairaj Rankireddy / Chirag Shetty (second round)
 Tinn Isriyanet / Kittisak Namdash (quarter-finals)
 Mark Lamsfuß / Marvin Emil Seidel (first round)
 Mohammad Ahsan / Hendra Setiawan (champions)
 Jason Ho-shue / Nyl Yakura (first round)
 Arjun M.R. / Ramchandran Shlok (first round)
 Chai Biao / Wang Zekang (withdrew)

Finals

Top half

Section 1

Section 2

Bottom half

Section 3

Section 4

Women's doubles

Seeds

 Jongkolphan Kititharakul / Rawinda Prajongjai (semi-finals)
 Della Destiara Haris / Rizki Amelia Pradipta (first round)
 Naoko Fukuman / Kurumi Yonao (second round)
 Chayanit Chaladchalam / Phataimas Muenwong (quarter-finals)
 Ayako Sakuramoto / Yukiko Takahata (champions)
 Tang Jinhua / Yu Xiaohan (quarter-finals)
 Émilie Lefel / Anne Tran (first round)
 Ashwini Ponnappa / N. Sikki Reddy (first round)

Finals

Top half

Section 1

Section 2

Bottom half

Section 3

Section 4

Mixed doubles

Seeds

 Tontowi Ahmad / Liliyana Natsir (final)
 Goh Soon Huat / Shevon Jemie Lai (champions)
 Marcus Ellis / Lauren Smith (second round)
 Chris Adcock / Gabby Adcock (second round)
 Mark Lamsfuß / Isabel Herttrich (second round)
 Marvin Emil Seidel / Linda Efler (second round)
 Lee Chun Hei / Chau Hoi Wah (quarter-finals)
 Pranav Chopra / N. Sikki Reddy (second round)

Finals

Top half

Section 1

Section 2

Bottom half

Section 3

Section 4

References

External links
 Tournament Link

Singapore Open (badminton)
Singapore Open
Singapore Open
Singapore Open (badminton)